Qingshuijiang Township, is a rural township in Liling City, Zhuzhou City, Hunan Province, People's Republic of China.

Cityscape
The township is divided into 9 villages, the following areas: Wenshan Village, Zengjiatan Village, Guoqiangfu Village, Qingshuijiang Village, Yangmudang Village, Jing Village, Jiebei Village, Longtang Village, and Dongshan Village.

References

Historic township-level divisions of Liling